In computer vision, the inverse depth parametrization is a parametrization used in methods for 3D reconstruction from multiple images such as simultaneous localization and mapping (SLAM).

Inverse depth parametrization generally improves numerical stability and allows to represent points with zero parallax. Moreover, the error associated to the observation of the point's position can be modelled with a Gaussian distribution when expressed in inverse depth. This is an important property required to apply methods, such as Kalman filters, that assume normality of the measurement error distribution. The major drawback is the larger memory consumption, since the dimensionality of the point's representation is doubled.

Definition 

References

Bibliography 
 
 
 
 

Computer vision